The title Hero of the Kyrgyz Republic (Kyrgyz: Кыргыз Республикасынын Баатыры) is a state award of the Kyrgyz Republic. It was established on 16 April 1996 by the law "On the establishment of state awards of the Kyrgyz Republic". As of June 2014, 23 people have been awarded the title.

Ak-Shumkar Medal 
Once the title is conferred upon a person, they are presented with the Ak Shumkar Medal and the corresponding certificate. It is worn on the left side of the chest above other orders and medals. The medal is made of gold and is a symmetrical star consisting of eight upper-level beams forming a circle with a diameter of 40 millimeters. The block is presented in the form of a tumar (an ancient Kyrgyz talisman), where a relief drawing of a tynduk is placed on a red field.

Recipients 
 Tugelbay Sydykbekov, the patriarch of Kyrgyz literature – February 4, 1997 
 Chingiz Aitmatov, writer and public figure – February 4, 1997  
 Turgunbay Sadykov, sculptor – February 4, 1997  
 Salizhan Sharipov, Russian pilot-cosmonaut - February 3, 1998
 Turdakun Usubalijev, Leader of the Kirghiz SSR – October 14, 1999 
 Sabira Kumushaliyeva, actress, People's Artist of the Kyrgyz Republic – August 22, 2000 
 Akbaraly Kabaev, Kyrgyz construction manager – August 22, 2002 
 Kurmanbek Arykov, Kyrgyz construction manager – August 22, 2002 
 Asankhan Dzhumakhmatov, composer – January 26, 2003  
 Mambet Mamakeev, Kyrgyz surgeon – November 24, 2004 
 Absamat Masaliyev, Leader of the Kirghiz SSR – June 25, 2005 
 Suyunbai Eraliev, poet – October 31, 2006  
 , poet – February 16, 2007 
 Tolong Kasymbekov, writer – February 16, 2007 
 Ernst Akramov, Kyrgyz surgeon and public figure – November 20, 2009 
 Kuliyipa Konduchalova, prominent public and public figure – September 18, 2010 
 Dooronbek Sadyrbaev, Kyrgyz film director, writer and public figure – October 27, 2010 
 Iskhak Razzakov, party and state leader of the Kirghiz SSR – December 29, 2010 
 Alisbek Alymkulov, Minister for Youth Affairs of the Kyrgyz Republic – August 28, 2011 
 Mutalip Mamytov, Kyrgyz neurosurgeon – August 28, 2011 
 Tashtanbek Akmatov, politician – March 12, 2013 
 Zhusup Mamay, People's Artist of the Kyrgyz Republic – May 30, 2014
 Almazbek Atambaev, former President of Kyrgyzstan – November 27, 2017

References 

Orders, decorations, and medals of Kyrgyzstan
Awards established in 1996
Hero (title)